Wang Baoshan (born on April 13, 1963) is a Chinese former international football player who is currently the manager of Shaanxi Chang'an Athletic. As a player he represented Shaanxi Province before being one of the first Chinese players who went to Japan when he joined Otsuka Pharmaceutical. Internationally he played for the Chinese national team at the 1988 AFC Asian Cup

Playing career
While Wang Baoshan was born in Pingyi, Shandong his family would move to Baoji in Shaanxi to see him graduate to the senior team of the Shaanxi Province football club by the 1980 Chinese league season. Unfortunately for Wang in his debut season he was part of the squad that came bottom of the league and his club were relegated at the end of the campaign. His time within the second tier would see him establish himself within the team and by the 1985 league season he would help aid Shaanxi win promotion back into the top tier, which soon caught the attention of the Chinese national team. With the national team he would play within the 1988 AFC Asian Cup and was part of the team that came fourth within the tournament. When he returned to club football he would move to Japan and joined Otsuka Pharmaceutical before he retired.

International goals

Management career
Wang Baoshan got his break in club management with second-tier football club Foshan Fosti in the 1995 league season and helped guide the club to a fifth-place finish. For the next several seasons he would guide the club to mid-table mediocrity until the club were taken over by Xiamen Yuanhua at the beginning of the 1998 league season and was subsequently released by the club. Wang wouldn't have to wait long for a new job and would take on the position of general manager for another second-tier club Yunnan Hongta, however he would quickly also serve as the club's manager for one season before he would settle on becoming the team's youth team manager for the next two seasons. His work with the youth team would quickly draw the attentions of the China U-20 team and he would lead them into the 2002 AFC Youth Championship where the team finished in a disappointing sixth-place finish. After the tournament the Chinese Football Association would decide not to renew his contract and Wang would join another second-tier football club Guangdong Xiongying in the 2003 league season and guide the team to a mid-table position. The following season saw the club decide to move to Shenzhen and rename themselves Shenzhen Kejian, Wang would again guide the club to another mid-table position, however the club was severely in debt and dissolved at the end of the 2004 league season.    
 
Wang would join another second-tier football club in Jiangsu Sainty, however his time with them only lasted one season when he was unable to win promotion with the club. In November 2005 Wang would receive his first attempt at the top tier when he was offered the management post at Shenzhen Jianlibao and led them into the 2006 league season. His time at the club was not very successful, he had lost the respect of the players and was floating above relegation also the club were in debt and could not afford to be relegated, which saw in September 2006 Wang being sacked as the team's manager and replaced by Xie Feng for the rest of the season. Wang would take a step back from being a Head coach and take on the assistant management position with the Chinese national team where he worked under Vladimir Petrović. The Chinese Football Association would sack Petrović in June 2008 which saw the National team without a Head coach to lead them into important 2011 AFC Asian Cup qualification matches, being the only assistant with top flight management experience there were rumours that Wang would lead the national team on at least a short-term basis, however the Chinese FA decided to bring in experienced coach Yin Tiesheng in instead. Strangely enough in July 2008 after being sacked from Shenzhen Jianlibao the club took him back but this time as a technical advisor.

In May 2009 the Head coach position at top-tier club Chengdu Blades became available after their previous manager Li Bing resigned, under Wang results would improve throughout the season and he would go on to lead the team onto a respectable seventh-place finish. Despite this achievement Chengdu Blades were relegated to the second tier before the start of the 2010 league season for match fixing after it was discovered the club had fixed a match several years ago. Wang decided to stay loyal towards the club and remained as manager to aid the club win immediate promotion back into the top tier at the end of the 2010 league season. Despite this achievement the club decided that they needed a new manager and brought in Lawrie McKinna for the start of the 2011 Chinese Super League season. After over a year out of management Chengdu Blades who had fallen back into the second tier asked for Wang's help half-way through the 2012 China League One season after the previous manager Niu Hongli had resigned.

In 2013, Wang became the head coach of Chongqing Lifan.

On 27 September 2018, Henan Jianye signed Wang to replace Chang Woe-ryong.

On 20 January 2022, Wang was named as the manager of Shaanxi Chang'an Athletic.

Managerial statistics

Note: win or lose by penalty shoot-out is counted as the draw in time.

References

External links
Profile at Sodasoccer.com

1963 births
Living people
People from Linyi
Chinese football managers
Chinese footballers
Footballers from Shandong
China international footballers
Chinese expatriate footballers
Tokushima Vortis players
Expatriate footballers in Japan
Footballers at the 1988 Summer Olympics
1988 AFC Asian Cup players
Olympic footballers of China
Jiangsu F.C. managers
Shenzhen F.C. managers
Chongqing Liangjiang Athletic F.C. managers
Tianjin Jinmen Tiger F.C. managers
Beijing Renhe F.C. managers
Henan Songshan Longmen F.C. managers
Footballers at the 1990 Asian Games
Association football forwards
Asian Games competitors for China
Chinese Super League managers